"Carry On, Hawkeye" was the 35th episode of the M*A*S*H television series, and eleventh of season two. The episode aired on November 24, 1973.

Plot
The 4077th MASH is in the midst of a flu epidemic, with Trapper bedridden, soon followed by Henry Blake and Frank Burns, leaving Hawkeye as the only surgeon and Margaret Houlihan as acting Commanding Officer.  Calls to headquarters for another surgeon prove fruitless, so Father Mulcahy and Radar are called to provide assistance in the operating room as Hawkeye starts developing flu symptoms.

Trivia

This episode mentions that Ralph Bunche was just awarded the Nobel Peace Prize, which happened in 1950.

Lynette Mettey returns to the series in this episode as a new nurse, Sheila Anderson. Mettey was previously seen as recurring character and love interest of Hawkeye, Nurse Nancy Griffin, in season one. She and Hawkeye had a relationship until "Ceasefire" (March 1973), when she dumped him after he told her he was married in an effort to provide an excuse for why he couldn't marry her after the war. This is the only time she appears as Sheila Anderson, although she pops up in two later episodes as Nurse "Able" and Nurse "Baker", both frequent names given to various nurses throughout the series.

Awards
The episode netted director Jackie Cooper a Best Directing in Comedy Emmy.

External links

M*A*S*H (season 2) episodes
1973 American television episodes
Television episodes directed by Jackie Cooper